Senator Ryan may refer to:

Allan A. Ryan Jr. (1903–1981), New York State Senate
Don Ryan (born 1951), Montana State Senate
Harold Lyman Ryan (1923–1995), Idaho State Senate
Harold M. Ryan (1911–2007), Michigan State Senate
Irene E. Ryan (1909–1997), Alaska State Senate
James Ryan (Wisconsin politician) (1830–1913), Wisconsin State Senate
John Ryan (New Mexico politician) (fl. 2000s–2010s), New Mexico State Senate
Scott Ryan (Australian politician) (born 1973), former President of the Australian Senate
Tim Ryan (Ohio politician) (born 1973), Ohio State Senate